The Argentina–Brazil border is the line that limits the territories of Argentina and Brazil.

Starting at the confluence of Paraná and Iguaçu rivers, it passes through the Iguaçu Falls and follows the thalweg of that river to the mouth of Santo Antônio River, then running upstream the course of this river until its source. From there the boundary runs  by land until reaching the source of the Peperi-Guaçu River and from there along the channel of that river to its confluence with the Uruguay River, then running downstream the course of the Uruguay to the mouth of river Quaraí.

It was defined by the Treaty of 1898 (which is based on an ), referred by President of the United States Grover Cleveland, and is perfectly demarcated. The characterization work is in charge of the so-called "Joint Commission for Inspecting the Mark of the Brazil-Argentina" (created in 1970), which has deployed 310 boundary markers.

References 

 
1898 establishments in Argentina
1898 establishments in Brazil
1898 in international relations
Borders of Argentina
Borders of Brazil
International borders